Ace Hardware Corporation is an American hardware retailers' cooperative based in Oak Brook, Illinois, United States. It is the world's largest hardware retail cooperative, and the largest non-grocery American retail cooperative.

Founded in 1924 as "Ace Stores", the company changed its name to "Ace Hardware Corporation" in 1931. It grew dramatically following World War II, more than tripling its sales between the late 1940s and 1959. After the retirement of longtime president and founder Richard Hesse in 1973, Ace was sold to its retailers, becoming a retailer-owned cooperative. It first reached $1 billion in wholesale sales in 1985 and $5 billion in 2015. , it has over 5,200 locations in 60 countries. Ace operates 17 distribution centers in the United States, and additional distribution facilities in China, Panama, and the United Arab Emirates.

History
In 1924, to increase buying power and profits, entrepreneurs Richard Hesse, E. Gunnard Lindquist, Frank Burke, and Oscar Fisher united their Chicago, Illinois, hardware stores into "Ace Stores". The company was named after the ace fighter pilots of World War I, who were able to overcome all odds. Ace Stores was incorporated in 1928, and the company opened its first warehouse a year later. In 1931, the name was changed to Ace Hardware Corporation.

By the end of the 1940s, Ace had wholesale sales of more than $7 million from the 133 stores it supplied. By its 35th anniversary in 1959, the company had more than tripled this figure, with wholesale sales of $24.5 million from 325 stores.

Founder and longtime president Richard Hesse retired in 1973. The company was thereafter sold to its retailers and restructured as a cooperative, moving its headquarters to Oak Brook, Illinois. Independent retailers became the exclusive shareholders in the company. The strategy proved successful, and Ace surpassed $1 billion in wholesale sales for the first time in 1985; it went on to pass $5 billion in 2015.

Under CEO Roger Peterson (1986-95), Ace sales more than doubled from $801M in 1983 to more than $2B in 1993.  In October 1994, Ace launched a strategic plan known as “The New Age of Ace” with the objective, by 2000, to improve retail performance, more efficient operations, international growth, and a faster pace for new store openings.

In 2012, Ace Hardware acquired its largest member, Westlake Ace Hardware, for $88 million. The following year, Ace's president and CEO John Venhuizen launched 20/20 Vision, a strategy to use network power to provide better customer service. , J. D. Power has ranked Ace Hardware "Highest in Customer Satisfaction with Home Improvement Retail Stores" for ten consecutive years.

In 2014 and 2015, Ace launched its wholesale distribution network through the acquisition of the Portland, Maine, based Emery-Waterhouse and the Spokane, Washington-based Jensen Distribution Services. Later that year, Ace expanded its wholesale operations coast-to-coast with the formation of Emery Jensen Distribution, LLC. This new distribution arm operates under Ace Wholesale Holdings LLC, a subsidiary of Ace Hardware Corporation, and is dedicated to serving non-Ace Hardware independent retailers.

Advertising

In 1989, Ace's longtime jingle "Ace is the place with the helpful hardware man" was modified, replacing man with the more inclusive and accurate folks.  Celebrities Connie Stevens (from 1974 to 1978) and Suzanne Somers (from 1979 into the early 1980s) starred in TV commercials for Ace Hardware. For many years, former NFL coach and NFL commentator John Madden also starred in Ace commercials. In 2016, Ace introduced a new series of commercials featuring associates addressing customers' needs, and a contextually-appropriate version of the Ace jingle (such as, after a customer asks for a lubricant they think is called 10W40, "Ace is the place for the stuff for squeaking hinges that's called WD-40. Not 10-W40, which is motor oil, that we also sell.")

Home improvement expert Lou Manfredini serves as Ace's "Helpful Hardware Man" and media spokesman.

International operations
In 1990, Ace created a separate division known as Ace International and over the following 20 years, established a presence throughout Asia, the Caribbean, Latin America, and the Middle East regions. In 2010, Tim-Br Mart Group acquired licensing rights to the Ace brand name in Canada. Four years later, Rona, Inc., signed an agreement with Ace Hardware for the master license to the Ace brand in Canada. Lowe's completed its acquisition of Rona in May 2016. Rona assigned the Winnipeg office as Ace Canada, formally TruServ Canada, to manage the Ace Brand. , there are 62 Ace-branded stores in Canada.  Beginning in 2017, Lowe's Distribution Center began to service Ace Canada retailers. In March 2020, Peavey Mart acquired the master license and began to service the 107 Canadian locations.

Ace Hardware Philippines Inc was founded in 1997, opening its first branch in the Philippines at SM Southmall in Metro Manila. Currently, Ace Hardware has more than 100 branches all over the country. ACE Hardware is an affiliate of the SM Group of Companies.

Ace Hardware Malaysia currently has 22 branches nationwide as of January 1, 2022.

PT Ace Hardware Indonesia Tbk, a listed franchisee controlled by local family business  (which owns 59.97%), opened the world's largest Ace Hardware shop, in Living World Mall, Alam Sutera, South Tangerang, Indonesia. As of December 2, 2011, there were 52 branches in Indonesia.

In 1991, Al-Futtaim Group obtained the licensing rights for ACE in the Middle East, now ACE stores trade in six different locations in the United Arab Emirates alone, holding significant market share in the categories of outdoor furniture, Power Tools, gardening, and do-it-yourself in the UAE.

References

 Working at Ace Hardware Philippines, Inc. | Bossjob

External links

 Ace Hardware
 Ace Hardware History

Hardware stores of the United States
Home improvement retailers of the United States
Retailers' cooperatives in the United States
American companies established in 1924
Retail companies established in 1924
1924 establishments in Illinois
Companies based in DuPage County, Illinois
Oak Brook, Illinois